María Soledad Rodríguez Belli (born 17 April 1990), known by her stage name Sol Rodríguez, is an Argentinian actress and model, of Spanish and Italian descent. She is best known for the role of Mecha in the Nickelodeon Latin America's series Grachi. Rodríguez has released several songs from the soundtrack of Grachi, sung along with other members of the cast. Rodríguez also starred as Teresa Ramirez in the second season of Star Trek: Picard.

Biography and career 
Born in 1990 in Buenos Aires, Argentina, Sol Rodríguez started dancing when she was 5. At the age of 8 she moved with her family to Guatemala, where she continued dancing and singing. She was part of a girl group in school who performed in parent reunions and school activities, and she started doing TV commercials when she was ten. In 2006 she moved with her parents to Miami where she studied in Miami Dade College, but she then dropped to sign up with a talent agency in Miami. Some weeks later she did her first print work for Reebok.

Her first casting was for Nickelodeon Latin America, where she landed a co-starring role in the original production Grachi. Thanks to the response of the fans they did three seasons, being number one in ratings in many of Latin Americas countries. There was also a musical tour during the second season, Grachi: El Show en Vivo, that traveled to many Mexico cities. In Argentina they did 10 shows in Teatro Gran Rex and traveled to Santa Fe getting great response from the fans. Rodríguez recorded a song for the second Grachi album with Isabella Castillo named M.A.P.S and was nominated to Nickelodeons Kids' Choice Awards Mexico for Best Supporting Actress and Kids' Choice Awards Argentina for Newcomer.

In 2013 she was named in the Best 10 Dressed for 2013 Latin Billboard Music Awards and signed with Telemundo for a new soap opera called Marido en alquiler who interprets the character of Sol Porras. Sol Rodriguez latest performance was in Demente Criminal for Venevisión and Univision.

Filmography

Musical theatre

Awards and nominations

References

External links 

1990 births
Living people
Actresses from Buenos Aires
21st-century Argentine women singers
Argentine television actresses
Argentine television personalities
Argentine people of Italian descent
Argentine people of Spanish descent